Atte may refer to the following people:

Finnish given name
Atte Engren (born 1988), Finnish ice hockey goaltender
Atte Hoivala (born 1992), Finnish football player
Atte Mäkinen (born 1995), Finnish ice hockey defenceman
Atte Muhonen (1888–1954), Finnish farmer and politician
Atte Mustonen (born 1988), Finnish motor racing driver
Atte Ohtamaa (born 1987), Finnish ice hockey defenceman 
Atte Pentikäinen (born 1982), Finnish ice hockey defenseman 

African surname
Ismaila Atte-Oudeyi (born 1985), Togolese football player
Zanzan Atte-Oudeyi (born 1980), Togolese football player

Finnish masculine given names